is a professional Japanese baseball player. He plays outfielder for the Tokyo Yakult Swallows.

References 

1999 births
Living people
Baseball people from Saitama Prefecture
Japanese baseball players
Nippon Professional Baseball outfielders
Tokyo Yakult Swallows players